Montañeses Fútbol Club is a football club that plays in the Liga Premier de México – Serie A. It is based in Orizaba, Mexico.

History
On June 26, 2021, Fuertes de Fortín F.C., team from Fortín de las Flores, secured won promotion from the Liga TDP to the Liga Premier de México after defeating Toluca in the regional final. Following this result, the team secured a place in the Serie A de México. A week later, the club won the national championship in that category.

After being promoted, the Fuertes de Fortín board of directors began to receive offers from other cities such as Córdoba, Orizaba, Xalapa and Tuxtepec to relocate the club in those locations, due to the fact that the sports facilities of Fortín de las Flores did not comply with the requirements to participate in the Liga Premier. However, the team intended to continue in their hometown even though they could not promote. At the end of July, Orizaba's offer began to gain acceptance among the club's owners.

On July 22, 2021 Fuertes de Fortín was sold to businessmen from Orizaba, who relocated it to their city and was renamed Montañeses F.C., after the originally proposed name, Academia Orizaba F.C. It could not be used due to the disaffiliation of Albinegros de Orizaba, former club that played in Orizaba, which had the right to use the name of the city in Mexican football. On July 30, the club's participation in Serie A de México was confirmed, being placed in Group 2.

Stadium

Estadio Socum (deriving from So-Cu-M, the short version of its full name Estadio de la Sociedad Cuauhtémoc Moctezuma) is a football stadium in Orizaba, Veracruz, Mexico and it has capacity for 7,000 people.

The team also plays some of its matches at the Complejo Deportivo Orizaba Sur, a sports complex that has a soccer stadium which has an approximate capacity for 3,000 people.

Players

First-team squad

References

Association football clubs established in 2021
Liga Premier de México
Football clubs in Veracruz
2021 establishments in Mexico